Edi Angelillo (born 7 September 1961) is an Italian actress, television personality and singer. She is sometimes credited as Edy Angelillo.

Life and career 
Born Edilberta Angelillo in Venice, she is the daughter of singers and stage artists who performed with the name Franco & Regina.

Angelillo studied dance, mime and acting, and at 19 years old, in 1979, she made her film debut in Maurizio Nichetti's Ratataplan. The same year, Angelillo debuted on television as an assistant in Rai 1 variety show Domenica in, and recorded her first single as a singer. In 1981, she acted in theatre the play La vita comincia ogni mattina, with Gino Bramieri.

In 1984, after having been an assistant of Pippo Baudo at the Sanremo Music Festival, she focused her activities on stage. 

In 1997 she was nominated to the David di Donatello for best supporting actress thanks to her performance in La bruttina stagionata.

References

External links 
 

Italian film actresses
Italian television actresses
Italian stage actresses
1961 births
Actors from Venice
Living people
Italian television personalities